Rælingen is a village and municipality in Akershus in Viken county, Norway.  It is part of the traditional region of Romerike.  The administrative centre of the municipality is the village of Fjerdingby.  Rælingen was separated from the municipality of Fet on 1 July 1929.

General information

Name
The name is first mentioned around 1400 ("i Ræling"). It is probably an old district name (the name of the church site is Fjerdingby). The meaning of the name is unknown.

Coat-of-arms
The coat-of-arms is from modern times.  They were granted on 30 April 1981.  The arms show a yellow pitchfork on a green background.  It is a symbol for the local agriculture. A large part of the municipality is lowland, which historically has mainly been used to produce hay.  The pitchfork has three prongs representing the three rivers that run through the municipality: Nitelva, Leira, and Glomma.

Geography
Located between Fet and Lørenskog, Rælingen includes the northwestern part of lake Øyeren. The northernmost part of the district is built and grown together with the Lillestrøm area.

The most important places in the municipality are Rælingen, Fjerdingby, Løvenstad, and Nordby. Large portions of the municipality are scarcely populated or uninhabited (forests).

Notable people
 Stine Buer, (Norwegian Wiki) (born 1971 in Rælingen) Norwegian TV-personality, actress and comedian 
 Guro Sibeko (born 1975) a Norwegian novelist, non-fiction writer and activist; brought up in Rælingen
 Ida Fladen, (Norwegian Wiki) (born 1986 in Rælingen) Norwegian radio and TV personality 
 Anders Gaasland (born 1992 in Rælingen)  politician, gay rights activist
 Kristoffer Ajer (born 1998 in Rælingen) footballer who currently plays for Brentford
 Christian Sørum (born 1995), Norwegian beach volleyball player
 Henrik Kristoffersen (born 1994), Norwegian World Cup alpine ski racer, World Champion, and Olympic medalist

Sister cities
The following cities are twinned with Rælingen:
  - Kirkkonummi, Etelä-Suomi, Finland
  - Munkedal, Västra Götaland County, Sweden

References

External links

Municipal fact sheet from Statistics Norway

 
Municipalities of Akershus
Municipalities of Viken (county)
Villages in Akershus